The 1993 Florida Gators football team represented the University of Florida during the 1993 NCAA Division I-A football season. The season was the fourth for Steve Spurrier as the head coach of the Florida Gators football team. The Gators compiled a 10–2 overall record.

The Gators used coach Spurrier's pass-heavy "fun 'n gun" offense".  Although the Gators fell short of their hopes for a national championship, the 1993 season marked the first time that they were ranked in the top ten of the Associated Press Poll during every week of the season, and they were ranked fifth in the final AP Poll, following their 41–7 Sugar Bowl victory over the 11-0, 3rd ranked West Virginia Mountaineers.

Before the season
The players' and fans' preseason expectations for the Gators' fourth season under Spurrier were high, and some commentators began to speak openly about the possibility of the Gators making a run for the national title.

Schedule

Primary source: 2015 Florida Gators Football Media Guide.

Roster

Game summaries

Arkansas State

The season opened in the Swamp with a 44–6 defeat of Arkansas State.

Arkansas State scored first, but Florida responded with 44 unanswered, including a 35-yard touchdown pass from Terry Dean to Jack Jackson.

at Kentucky

In the second week of play, Florida managed a close 24–20 win over Kentucky. Quarterbacks Danny Wuerffel and Terry Dean combined to throw a total of seven interceptions.

With eight seconds left, Wuerffel threw a pass down the middle to walk-on receiver Chris Doering for the game-winning touchdown; Gator play-by-play announcer Mick Hubert shouted, "Doering's got a touchdown!"

Tennessee

In a "shootout" the Gators defeated the Vols by a single touchdown, 41 to 34.

Heath Shuler completed 25 of 41 passes for 355 yards and five touchdowns; and Danny Wuerffel completed 19 of 38 for 231 yards and three touchdowns. Errict Rhett rushed for 147 yards and two touchdowns.

A group of Tennessee fans, including coach Phillip Fulmer's wife, complained to the SEC about the behavior of Gators fans. They claim cups of urine were thrown on them during the game.

Mississippi State

The next week saw a 38–24   win over Mississippi State. Wuerffel and Doering teamed up for three touchdown passes.

Down 21–17, Jack Jackson had a 100-yard kickoff return to put the Gators up 24–21.

LSU

In Baton Rouge, Florida scored 58 unanswered to beat the LSU Tigers 58–3. Wuerffel completed 14 passes for 221 yards and four touchdowns.

It was the largest margin of victory over a road opponent under Spurrier and the worst loss in LSU football history.

at Auburn

Coach Terry Bowden's undefeated Auburn Tigers upset the Gators 38–35.  On a cold, drizzling, dreary day in Auburn, the fourth-ranked Gators amassed 560 yards of total offense, including 386 yards passing by quarterback Danny Wuerffel and 196 yards rushing by tailback Errict Rhett.

But the Gators' offensive fireworks were not enough for the win, as Auburn's defense sacked Wuerffel four times and made two key interceptions.  The two teams were tied at 35 with 1:21 left in the game, when Tigers placekicker Scott Etheridge booted a 41-yard field to beat the Gators, 38–35. Auburn dropped the Gators to their lowest ranking (10th) of the season.

vs. Georgia

Florida beat rival Georgia 33–26. In constant rain, the usually prolific passing game of coach Steve Spurrier's Gators was stymied.  Instead, the Gators relied on tailback Errict Rhett to amass 183 yards and two touchdowns to build a 33–26 fourth-quarter lead.

Led by quarterback Eric Zeier, the Georgia Bulldogs mounted a drive into Florida territory in the final minute and a half.  Zeier completed what appeared to be the game-tying touchdown to Jerry Jerman with five seconds remaining in the game.

However, Gators cornerback Anthone Lott had called a timeout just before the ball was snapped, forcing the Bulldogs to play the down again.  Lott was called for pass interference on the ensuing play, giving Georgia one last untimed chance to score.  Zeier's final pass fell incomplete, and the Gators won a hard-fought, but controversial 33–26 victory.

Southwestern Louisiana

Florida piled up a 61–14 score on the Ragin' Cajuns. Terry Dean burned the Cajun defense for 6 touchdown passes, "one of the most productive halves by a quarterback in UF history."

South Carolina

In Columbia, the Gators beat the South Carolina Gamecocks 37–26. The Gamecocks jumped out to a 17–0 lead, but the Gators cut the lead to 23–20 by halftime.

Down 26–23, Jack Jackson avoided a safety and ran free for 76 yards. After a roughing the passer penalty, Errict Rhett scored and the Gators never relinquished the lead.

Vanderbilt

Florida clinched another SEC east title, shutting out the Vanderbilt Commodores 52–0. The offense sputtered despite the score, but Ron Zook's defense provided the shutout.

Florida State

Florida also lost to the national champion and rival Florida State Seminoles 33–21. The Florida offense was stymied early, and Dean subbed for Wuerffel by the second half. The Gators never led, although they had cut the score to 27–21 late.

With just under six minutes left and the crowd roaring, the Seminoles faced third down at its 21-yard-line. Heisman Trophy-winning quarterback Charlie Ward hit freshman running back Warrick Dunn on a drag route, who turned up the sideline for a 79-yard touchdown and a 33–21 FSU win.

Postseason

SEC Championship Game: Alabama

The Gators finished the regular season with a conference record of 7–1, and in first place among the six teams of the SEC Eastern Division, thus earning a berth in the second SEC Championship Game in Birmingham, Alabama.  The Gators were paired against the Alabama Crimson Tide in the championship game—a rematch of the 1992 SEC Championship Game.

The Gators defeated the Crimson Tide 28–13, winning their first SEC Championship Game and their second SEC football championship in three seasons.

Sugar Bowl: West Virginia

The Gators then defeated third-ranked West Virginia Mountaineers 41–7 in the Sugar Bowl, finishing fifth in the AP Poll. After a quick touchdown from Jake Kelchner to Jay Kearney to put West Virginia up 7–0 early, the Gators came right back and answered with a touchdown by Errict Rhett to tie the score at 7.

It seemed the half would end that way, but just before halftime, Gator defensive back Lawrence Wright picked off an errant pass from West Virginia QB Darren Studstill right on the midfield logo. He first made his way to his right side, but when he ran out of blocking help just inside the WVU 40, he turned around and backtracked, circling back to the 45 before finding some running room, and he sprinted into the end zone from there to cap a 51-yard interception return touchdown. That put Florida up 14–7, and crushed the Mountaineers' competitive spirit, as Florida's defense proceeded to force a quick three and out, which gave Terry Dean time to connect with Jack Jackson for a 39-yard touchdown to make it 21–7 at halftime.

From there, the Gators cruised in the second half. Errict Rhett ran in two more touchdowns and Judd Davis added two insurance field goals in the fourth quarter to make the final score a convincing 41–7.

Postseason
The 1993 team set a then-record for wins in a season. Halfback Errict Rhett, offensive tackle Reggie Green, and defensive tackle William Gaines were first-team All-SEC. Placekicker Judd Davis won the Lou Groza Award.

References

Florida
Florida Gators football seasons
Southeastern Conference football champion seasons
Sugar Bowl champion seasons
Florida Gators football